Bairdstown is an unincorporated community in Greene and Oglethorpe counties, in the U.S. state of Georgia.

History
Bairdstown was originally called "Hurricane Branch", and under the latter name settlement was made in 1825. The present name is after one Mr. Baird, a local resident. A post office called Bairdstown was established in 1845, and remained in operation until 1959. In 1900, the community had 86 inhabitants.

References

Unincorporated communities in Greene County, Georgia
Unincorporated communities in Oglethorpe County, Georgia
Unincorporated communities in Georgia (U.S. state)